Víctor Hugo Castañeda (born June 21, 1962) is a Chilean football former footballer and current manager.

Career

Player
Castañeda was born in San Vicente de Tagua Tagua, and played for Palestino most of his career. He joined Universidad de Chile in 1992, and obtained 2 National Titles (1994 and 1995).

He was part of the Chile national football team during the 1998 FIFA World Cup qualifiers, but retired before he could play in the World Cup and was invited to be a part of Nelson Acosta's staff during the World Cup.

Manager
In 2002, he was signed as coach of Universidad de Chile, a post that he left in 2003 after irregular campaigns. In 2005, Castañeda arrived to Deportes La Serena. That year, in the 2005 Clausura, the team got to the semifinals after winning 4-1 in penalties to Colo Colo, but then, lost to Universidad Católica. After a narrowness the later years, La Serena finished second in the regular phase of the 2009 Clausura, the best place ever in the history of the team. La Serena reached semifinals that tournament.

In the last days of April 2011, he was signed as the new coach of Universidad de Concepción, but for less than a year as he was on March 26, 2012 fired due to bad results.

On May 3, 2012, he signed as manager of Everton, a team from the Chilean Primera División B. On November 26, 2012, Everton was promoted to Chilean Primera División.

Personal life
He also played alongside his younger brother, Cristián, for Palestino, Universidad de Chile and the Chile national team. In addition, his cousins Marco and Roly were with the Palestino youth ranks, as well as his uncle Manuel, who was with the reserve team.

In 2021, he was a candidate for both Alcalde of La Serena and deputy for the Coquimbo Region, supported by UDI, but he wasn't elected.

Honours

Player

Club
Universidad de Chile
 Primera División de Chile (2): 1994, 1995

References

1962 births
Living people
People from Cachapoal Province
Chilean footballers
Chile international footballers
Club Deportivo Palestino footballers
Deportes Concepción (Chile) footballers
Universidad de Chile footballers
Chilean Primera División players
Chilean football managers
Universidad de Chile managers
Deportes La Serena managers
Universidad de Concepción managers
Everton de Viña del Mar managers
Coquimbo Unido managers
Chilean Primera División managers
Primera B de Chile managers
Association football midfielders
Outfield association footballers who played in goal
Chilean politicians
Chilean sportsperson-politicians
21st-century Chilean politicians